Harold Arvine Davis (January 16, 1903 – January 8, 1955) was a pulp fiction writer who wrote several Doc Savage novels under the pseudonym Kenneth Robeson.

Doc Savage novels
 The King Maker 
 Dust of Death 
 The Land of Fear 
 The Golden Peril 
 The Living Fire Menace 
 The Mountain Monster 
 The Munitions Master 
 The Green Death 
 Merchants of Disaster 
 The Crimson Serpent 
 The Purple Dragon 
 Devils of the Deep 
 The Exploding Lake

External links
 
 Davis info at The Hidalgo Trading Co.

1903 births
1955 deaths
20th-century American male writers
20th-century American novelists
American male novelists
Pulp fiction writers